Cabo Verde Airlines flies to 3 domestic destinations and 1 international destination. The list includes the city, country, and the airport's name, with the airline's hubs and previously served destinations marked where applicable.

Destinations

References 

Cabo Verde Airlines